Nioumamakana  or Niouma Makana is a village and rural commune in the Cercle of Kati in the Koulikoro Region of south-western Mali. The commune covers an area of 311 square kilometers and includes 10 villages. In the 2009 census it had a population of 7,442. The administrative centre (chef-lieu) is the village of Nioumamakana.

References

External links
.

Communes of Koulikoro Region